Fenton United Methodist Church is the oldest congregation in Fenton, Michigan. The group's church is located at 119 South Leroy Street.

The hymn tune "Keddy" was composed by Edwin R. Taylor for the text, "O God, Your Hand is Guiding Us" (penned by long-time church member, Beulah Keddy), and was first sung on May 3, 1987, at the church's 150th anniversary.

References

Further reading
The 104th Anniversary, Fenton United Methodist Church, Fenton, Michigan, 1837–1977 The Church, 1977 - Methodist Church in Michigan - 19 pages
Lake Fenton United Methodist Church published by Lake Fenton United Methodist Church, 1984 - Fenton (Mich.) - 100 pages

External links
Fenton United Methodist Church website

Methodist churches in Michigan
Buildings and structures in Livingston County, Michigan
Michigan State Historic Sites